Silent Enemy may refer to:

 "Silent Enemy" (Star Trek: Enterprise), the 12th episode of the television series Star Trek: Enterprise
 "Chapter 2: The Silent Enemy", an episode of the television series Cliffhangers
 The Silent Enemy (1930 film), a drama about pre-Christopher Columbus Native Americans starring Native Americans
 The Silent Enemy (1958 film), a British Second World War film
 Silent Enemy, a 2011 novel by Tom Young (novelist)